The 1802 Connecticut gubernatorial election took place on April 8, 1802. Incumbent Federalist Governor Jonathan Trumbull Jr. won re-election to a fifth full term, defeating Democratic-Republican candidate Ephraim Kirby.

Results

References 

Gubernatorial
Connecticut
1802